Karakulam Chandran is a Malayalam language drama, television serial, film actor and drama director from Kerala, India. He has directed 118 plays and acted in over fifty plays. He has also acted in 88 television serials and five movies. He has won more than eighty state level awards, including the state award for best drama director (in 1997, 1998, 1999, 2000 years), Kerala Sangeetha Nataka Akademi Award for Best Drama Director (2008), the State Government's special jury award for best serial actor (2015) and the Ramu Karyat Award for outstanding contribution (2008).

Biography 
He was born on April 19, 1950, to Narayana Pillai and Vishalakshi Amma at Nellivila House, Karakulam, near Nedumangad in Thiruvananthapuram district.

At the age of four, he began his acting career as a child actor in a play in a rural library. After joining as a student in Prof. G. Sankara Pillai's drama school, he became active in the field of professional drama in 1968. Vayala Vasudevan Pillai's Theerthadanam was his first professional play. 

He excelled in the field of theater under Thoppil Bhasi for more than a decade. He worked for KPAC from 1970 to 1981 and formed the Ajanta drama troupe from Kollam in 1985. Ajantha performed about twenty plays. He has directed 118 plays and acted in over fifty plays. He has also acted in 88 television serials and five malayalam movies. The last play he acted in was Ajantha's Aakashavilakku.

He died on December 7, 2018, due to a heart attack.

Awards 
 Kerala State Drama Award - in 1997, 1998, 1999 and 2000
 Kerala Sangeetha Nataka Akademi Award for Best Drama Director (2008)
 State Government Special Jury Award for Best Serial Actor (2015)
 Ramu Kariyat Award for Outstanding Contribution (2008)
 He received more than eighty state-level awards, and more than 800 awards including local awards.

References

Indian male film actors
Male actors in Malayalam cinema
Indian male stage actors
Indian theatre directors
1950 births
2018 deaths
Recipients of the Kerala Sangeetha Nataka Akademi Award